Long Live the Queen is a simulation role-playing video game developed by Hanako Games and Spiky Caterpillar, published by Hanako Games. The story of the game follows a young princess who is training to become queen after the death of her mother. The objective of the game is to keep the princess alive for 40 weeks until she turns 15 and is crowned. The game was released on June 2, 2012 for Windows, Mac OS and Linux. The game uses anime-style graphics and is written in English.

In July 2022, Long Live the Queen was released on PlayStation 4, PlayStation 5, Xbox One, Xbox Series, and Nintendo Switch by Ratalaika Games. It was also translated into French, Spanish, German, and Japanese.

Plot
The queen of Nova has recently died, and her daughter, the 14-year-old princess Elodie, must leave her schooling to ready herself to become the next queen. Her coronation is set for 40 weeks from the present—her 15th birthday. Many people in the kingdom are trying to take advantage of the recent monarch's death and attempt to kill Elodie.

Gameplay

The player reads through the story and schedules the protagonist's weekly lessons, on topics such as economy, foreign affairs, logistics, expression, military matters, self-defense, intrigues, doublespeak, and magic. Based on those activities, Elodie increases her proficiency in various statistics. Additionally, during the weekend Elodie has free run of the castle and can choose an activity that alters her mood. She has four emotional axes, and her position on each determines her proficiency at learning certain topics: for instance, being "Willful" will help her master military and intrigue skills easier, but it will also hamper learning civil skills like royal demeanor. Once all three sub-skills of a particular skill are raised to a certain point (around 30 each), Elodie gains an outfit that boosts that specific skill.
Learning some skills unlocks additional weekend actions: for example, learning "Dance" allows her to attend balls, while "Reflexes" gives her the ability to play tennis.

As the weeks progress, Elodie is presented with various social and political opportunities. When they occur, the game performs checks against Elodie's current skills and chooses an outcome, sometimes without giving the player the option of interceding.
For instance, one of the first skill checks (a snake attack) requires 10 points in the "Composure" skill. Should Elodie be successful, she keeps her cool, allowing a guard to kill the snake; should she fail, her cousin gets bitten, an event whose consequences can be felt in one specific route the game can take.
Most of the checks can be failed without serious consequence, but some can close off entire branches of the story.
Very often, however, passing or failing a skill check is a matter of life or death for Elodie: if her skills aren't up to par, she dies (in one of various possible ways).

Because of the branching decision trees, the game features multiple endings, varying according to whom Elodie marries, how she dealt with neighboring nations, her ability with magic, the fate of her father Joslyn, and—of course—whether she survived to her coronation at all.

Development
The game was developed by Hanako Games, which also created Cute Knight, Cute Knight Kingdom, and Magical Diary, all of which are designed for girls but appeal to a wider audience. Long Live The Queen has darker themes than the previous titles.

A free update for the game was released on January 26, 2015  adding new characters, story elements and endings and other content to the game.

Reception
Technology Tell gave a score of 90/100 to the game, writing: "It’s really an unusual adventure and I admire Hanako Games and Spiky Caterpillar for stepping a little outside their comfort zone to release a darker game that requires players to think smart and manage emotions to keep a character alive." IndieGames was positively reviewed, writing: "Long story short, Long Live The Queen is a solid title."

References

External links
 Official website
 

2012 video games
Linux games
MacOS games
Video games developed in the United Kingdom
Video games featuring female protagonists
Windows games
PlayStation 4 games
PlayStation 5 games
Nintendo Switch games
Xbox One games
Xbox Series X and Series S games
Ren'Py games
Steam Greenlight games
Yuri (genre) video games
Simulation video games